Forbidden Evil is the debut album by American thrash metal band Forbidden, released in 1988. The title of the album refers to their original name before shortening it to Forbidden in 1987. The album was well received by both critics and fans and eventually became a cult classic.

Album information
Forbidden Evil was produced by Doug Caldwell and John Cuniberti, best known for working with Joe Satriani, at Alpha & Omega Recording, Studio 245 (both located in San Francisco) and Prairie Sun Recording in Cotati. The album's recording sessions took place in mostly 1988.

The album features future Slayer drummer Paul Bostaph and three of the songs were co-written by Robb Flynn, who later played with Vio-lence and Machine Head – although he never played on the album.

As of 2009, it is the only forbidden album to feature guitarist Glen Alvelais, who left in 1989 and would later join Testament (which had also featured Bostaph). He was replaced by Tim Calvert, who would remain with the band until their breakup in 1997.

The title track was covered by Temple of Blood on their 2008 release Overlord.

Track listing

The 2008 reissue of the album from Century Media includes four live bonus tracks, all recorded at the Trocadero Theatre in Philadelphia, Pennsylvania on October 23, 1988

Credits
 Russ Anderson – vocals
 Craig Locicero – lead guitar
 Glen Alvelais – rhythm guitar
 Matt Camacho – bass
 Paul Bostaph – drums
 Recorded at
Alpha & Omega Recording, San Francisco, California
Studio 245, San Francisco, California
Prairie Sun Recording, Cotati, California
 Produced by John Cuniberti and Doug Caldwell
 Recording engineered by John Cuniberti
 Assistant engineered by David Plank
 Mixed at Alpha & Omega
 Executive produced by Cliff Cultreri
 Mastered by Chris Bellman at Bernie Grundman, Los Angeles, California
 Cover art by Kent Mathieu

References

Forbidden (band) albums
Combat Records albums
1988 debut albums